Anak ni Palaris is a 1955 action film directed by Mario Barri and starring Fernando Poe Jr. The film marks Poe's screen debut. It is a sequel to Palaris (1941) and Awit ni Palaris (1946).

Cast 
 Fernando Poe, Jr.
 Rosita Noble
 Mario Escudero
 Ramon D'Salva
 Ruben Rustia
 Purita Alma
 Pedro Faustino
 Cecilio Joaquin

References

External links 
 

1955 films
1950s action films
Philippine black-and-white films
Philippine action films
Philippine sequel films